Florala Municipal Airport  is a city-owned public-use airport located three nautical miles (4 mi, 6 km) northeast of the central business district of Florala, a city in Covington County, Alabama, United States.

This airport is included in the FAA's National Plan of Integrated Airport Systems for 2011–2015 and 2009–2013, both of which categorized it as a general aviation facility.

Facilities and aircraft 
Florala Municipal Airport covers an area of 88 acres (36 ha) at an elevation of 314 feet (96 m) above mean sea level. It has one runway designated 4/22 with an asphalt surface measuring 3,197 by 75 feet (974 x 23 m).

For the 12-month period ending July 20, 2010, the airport had 21,940 aircraft operations, an average of 60 per day: 91% military and 9% general aviation. At that time there were 9 aircraft based at this airport: 100% single-engine.

See also 
 List of airports in Alabama

References

External links 
 Aerial image as of 16 February 1997 from USGS The National Map
 Airfield photos for 0J4 from Civil Air Patrol
 

Airports in Alabama
Transportation buildings and structures in Covington County, Alabama